Ushaw College (formally St Cuthbert's College, Ushaw), is a former Catholic seminary near the village of Ushaw Moor, County Durham, England, which is now a heritage and cultural tourist attraction. The college is known for its Georgian and Victorian Gothic architecture and listed nineteenth-century chapels. The college now hosts a programme of art exhibitions, music and theatre events, alongside tearooms and a café.

It was founded in 1808 by scholars from the English College, Douai, who had fled France after the French Revolution. Ushaw College was affiliated with Durham University from 1968 and was the principal Roman Catholic seminary for the training of Catholic priests in the north of England.

In 2011, the seminary closed, due to the shortage of vocations. It reopened as a visitor attraction, marketed as Ushaw: Historic House, Chapels & Gardens in late 2014 and, as of 2019, receives around 50,000 visitors a year. The County Durham Music Service and Durham University Centre for Evaluation and Monitoring are based at the college and buildings at the college are also used by Durham University Business School.

History

Founding
The English College, Douai was founded in 1568 but was forced to leave France in 1795 following the French Revolution.
Part of the college settled temporarily at Crook Hall near Lanchester, northwest of Durham. In 1804 Bishop William Gibson began to build at Ushaw Moor, four miles west of Durham. These buildings, designed by James Taylor, were opened as St Cuthbert's College in 1808.  There was a steady expansion during the nineteenth century with new buildings put up to cater for the expanding number of clerical and secular students. In 1847, the newly built chapel, designed by Augustus Welby Northmore Pugin was opened. This was followed by the Big Library and Exhibition Hall designed by Joseph Hansom, 1849–1851. The Junior House, designed by Peter Paul Pugin, was added in 1859. St Cuthbert's Chapel, designed by Dunn and Hansom, was opened in 1884, replacing AWN Pugin's 1847 chapel which the seminary had outgrown. The Refectory was designed and built by E. W. Pugin. The final development came in the early 1960s with the opening of a new East wing, providing additional classrooms and single bedrooms for 75 students.  The main college buildings are Grade II listed, the College Chapel is Grade II* and the Chapel of St Michael is Grade I.

University of Durham
Although independent, Ushaw College had a close working relationship with Durham University. The college became a Licensed Hall of Residence of the University of Durham in 1968. It was independent of the university but offered courses validated by the university, and both Church and lay students studied at the college.  The Junior House closed in 1972, its younger students being transferred to St Joseph's College, Up Holland in Lancashire.

21st Century
In 2002, the college rejected a report from the Roman Catholic hierarchy that it should merge with St Mary's College, Oscott, near Birmingham. However, in October 2010 it was announced that the college would close in 2011 due to the shortage of vocations in the Roman Catholic Church, and that the site might be sold. Following a detailed feasibility study by the college's Trustees and Durham University, and with support from Durham County Council and English Heritage, it was announced in January 2012 that Durham Business School would temporarily relocate to the college during rebuilding of the school's buildings in Durham. This was seen as the first step in a long-term education-based vision for the site.

The university also agreed to catalogue and archive the Ushaw library and inventory the other collections to ensure their preservation and specialist conservation, with a view to creating a proposed Ushaw Centre for Catholic Scholarship and Heritage. In March 2019, an uncatalogued early charter of King John was found in the library manuscript collection.

In 2017, Durham University announced plans to develop an international residential research library at Ushaw College, with the aim of attracting scholars from around the world to work on the collections of Ushaw, Durham University and Durham Cathedral. The university has also confirmed that it has extended the agreement to lease the east wing of the college (used by the Business School) to 2027. The college is also used for numerous musical events and for the Ushaw Lecture Series, organised by the university's Centre for Catholic Studies.

In 2018, Durham University's Centre for Evaluation and Monitoring (CEM) moved into the east wing of the college, previously used by the Business School.

Heraldry
The college armorial bearings are "Per pale dexter Argent a Cross Gules on a Canton Azure a Cross of St Cuthbert proper sinister impaling Allen Argent three Rabbits couchant in pale Sable."

Various emblems on shield represent the college's history and foundation, for example:-
 Three coneys are from the family coat of arms of William Allen, the founder of English College, Douai.  See Three hares.
 The small cross of St Cuthbert represents the college's patron saint (it is modelled on St Cuthbert's own pectoral cross, which is kept in the Treasury at Durham Cathedral).
 The large cross of St George honours the English Roman Catholic Martyrs.

Alumni

Clergy
 Nicholas Cardinal Wiseman – first Archbishop of Westminster
 Francis Cardinal Bourne – Archbishop of Westminster
 Arthur Cardinal Hinsley – Archbishop of Westminster
 William Cardinal Godfrey – Archbishop of Westminster
 John Carmel Cardinal Heenan – Archbishop of Westminster
 Rafael Cardinal Merry del Val y Zulueta – Cardinal Secretary of State
 Charles Petre Eyre – Archbishop of Glasgow.
 Louis Charles Casartelli – 4th Bishop of Salford
 Hugh Lindsay – 10th Bishop of Hexham and Newcastle
 James Chadwick – 2nd Bishop of Hexham and Newcastle
 Alexander Goss – Bishop of Liverpool
 Thomas Grant – Bishop of Southwark
 Mark Davies, Bishop of Shrewsbury
 John Lingard – author of The History Of England, From the First Invasion by the Romans to the Accession of Henry VIII
 Bernard Łubieński - Redemptorist missionary priest
 John Furniss – English Roman Catholic priest, known for his mission to children
 James Nugent – Roman Catholic priest of the Archdiocese of Liverpool
 Nicholas Rigby – English Roman Catholic priest and author of The Real Doctrine of the Church on Scripture
 Constantine Scollen – Irish Roman Catholic missionary priest and outstanding linguist in Canada in the mid- to late 19th century and author of Thirty Years among the Indians of the Northwest
 Paul Swarbrick - Bishop of Lancaster
 Philip Moger - Auxiliary Bishop of Southwark

Lay

 George Goldie – nineteenth-century ecclesiastical architect
 Edward Goldie – nineteenth- and twentieth-century ecclesiastical architect
 Alexander Martin Sullivan – Irish lawyer and defence counsel in the trial of Roger Casement
 Charles Napier Hemy – artist and Royal Academician
 Francis Thompson – English poet
 Joseph Gillow – author of Bibliographical Dictionary of the English Roman Catholics
 William Shee – first Roman Catholic to sit as a judge in England and Wales since the Reformation
 Francis Joseph Sloane (aka Francesco Giuseppe Sloane) - born 1794, died October 23, 1871, tutor at Ushaw and lifelong friend of Nicolas (later Cardinal) Wiseman, responsible for reviving the Montecatini Val di Cecina copper mine, which was the largest in Europe
 Paul Goggins – Labour Member of Parliament for Wythenshawe and Sale East and junior minister in the Northern Ireland Office.
 Joseph Scott – attorney in Los Angeles, founder of the Southwest Museum of the American Indian, vice-president of the Panama-Pacific International Exposition (1915)
 A.J. Hartley bestselling novelist and Shakespeare scholar
 Lafcadio Hearn (also known as Koizumi Yakumo) – author, best known for his books about Japan
 Francis Petre - prominent New Zealand-born architect designed the Cathedral of the Blessed Sacrament, Christchurch
 Peter Paul Pugin – English architect
 James Joseph Foy – Ontario Attorney General and political figure
 Myles William Patrick O'Reilly – Roman Catholic soldier and politician
 Archibald Matthias Dunn – Roman Catholic ecclesiastical architect
 Joe Tasker - Himalayan climber
 Charles Bruzon – Gibraltarian government minister and curate

List of presidents

 1794–1810  	Thomas Eyre
 1811–1828  	John Gillow
 1828–1833 	Thomas Youens
 1833–1836 	John Briggs
 1836–1837 	Thomas Youens
 1837–1863 	Charles Newsham
 1863–1876 	Robert Tate
 1876–1877 	Francis Wilkinson
 1877–1878 	James Chadwick
 1878–1885 	William Wrennall
 1885–1886  	William Dunderdale
 1886–1890 	James Lennon
 1890–1909 	Thomas Wilkinson
 1909–1910 	Joseph Corbishley
 1910–1934 	William Brown
 1934–1950 	Charles Corbishley
 1950–1967  	Paul Grant
 1967–1977 	Philip Loftus
 1977–1984 	Peter Cookson
 1984–1991 	Peter Walton
 1991–1997 	Richard Atherton
 1997–2003 	James O’Keefe
 2003–2008 	Terence Drainey
 2008–2011 	John Marsland

References

External links
 Ushaw: Historic House, Chapels & Gardens official site
 Roman Catholic Encyclopaedia Entry for Ushaw College
 Ushaw College Library
 St Cuthbert's Society, Ushaw (Alumni)
 Thomas Eyre, the first President
Former Colleges of the University of Durham

Colleges of Durham University
Grade II listed buildings in County Durham
Former Catholic seminaries
1568 establishments in England
Grade II listed educational buildings
Educational institutions established in 1808
Tourist attractions in County Durham
Former colleges of universities in the United Kingdom
Catholic seminaries in England